Bratislava, the capital city of Slovakia, is divided into five national administrative districts (: I, II, III, IV, V) and into 17 boroughs (literally: city parts, also translated as (city) districts or wards). These boroughs vary in size and population, from the smallest Lamač and least populated Čunovo to the largest Podunajské Biskupice and most populated Petržalka.

Each of the boroughs has its own mayor and council. The number of councillors in each depends on the size and population of that borough. Mayor and the local council are elected in municipal election every four years. The boroughs are responsible for issues of local significance such as urban planning, local roads maintenance, budget, local ordinances, parks maintenance, safety and so on.

Cadastral areas coincide with boroughs, except in two cases: Nové Mesto is further divided into the Nové Mesto and Vinohrady cadastral areas and Ružinov is divided into Ružinov, Nivy and Trnávka. Further divisions often, but not always include various unofficial quarters and localities.

Until 1943, Bratislava consisted more or less of the boroughs Staré Mesto, Nové Mesto and a part of Ružinov. That year, the village of Karlova Ves was annexed to Bratislava. In 1946, the formerly independent villages of Devín, Dúbravka, Lamač, Petržalka, Prievoz (part of Ružinov), Rača and Vajnory were annexed to Bratislava, increasing the total area of the city to 193.6 km2. The last territorial expansion of Bratislava to date occurred in 1972, with the villages of Devínska Nová Ves, Záhorska Bystrica, Vrakuňa, Podunajské Biskupice, Jarovce, Rusovce and Čunovo being annexed, creating the so-called Greater Bratislava (Veľká Bratislava) with an area of 367.5 km2. This was done in order to gain more space for massive apartments construction, which resulted in population growth from 143,000 in 1946 to around 450,000 in 1989.

The following table gives an overview of the boroughs, along with the district, population, area, founding or annexation date (if applicable) and location within Bratislava.

The following table shows various quarters or localities in the boroughs.

References

Bibliography

External links 

Official website of Bratislava (in Slovak)
Official Bratislava English-language website (in English)
Overview of boroughs (Official website of Bratislava) (in Slovak)

 
Bratislava